Lukov is a municipality and village in Zlín District in the Zlín Region of the Czech Republic. It has about 1,700 inhabitants.

Sights
Lukov is known for the Gothic Lukov Castle. It is a ruin of one of the largest and oldest Moravian castles.

References

External links

Villages in Zlín District